Woodville is a civil parish in the South Derbyshire district of Derbyshire, England.  The parish contains four listed buildings that are recorded in the National Heritage List for England.  All the listed buildings are designated at Grade II, the lowest of the three grades, which is applied to "buildings of national importance and special interest".   The parish contains the village of Woodville, and the listed buildings consist of a church, a war memorial, and buildings surviving from closed pottery works.


Buildings

References

Citations

Sources

 

Lists of listed buildings in Derbyshire